This is a list of casinos in Oregon.

List of casinos

Gallery

See also

 Gambling in Oregon
 List of casino hotels 
 List of casinos in the United States 
 List of federally recognized Native American tribes in Oregon
 Lists of Oregon-related topics

References

External links
 

 

 
Casinos
Native American-related lists
Oregon